Jules-Joseph-Taschereau Frémont (20 December 1855 – 28 March 1902) was a Canadian politician, author, lawyer and professor. He was a Liberal member of the House of Commons of Canada and a mayor of Quebec City.

Biography
Frémont was born in Quebec City, Quebec, the son of doctor Charles-Jacques Frémont and Marie-Cécile Panet. He was educated at the Collège Sainte-Marie, at St. Francis Xavier's College in New York City and the Université Laval and was called to the Quebec bar in 1878. He later became a professor of civil law at the Université Laval.

He was elected to Parliament at the Quebec County riding in the 1891 general election. After serving his term in the 7th Parliament, Frémont was defeated in the 1896 federal election by Charles Fitzpatrick, also of the Liberal party.

The inaugural Quebec Winter Carnival in 1894 occurred on Frémont's watch as Quebec City mayor.

In 1891, Frémont married Caroline-Alix, the daughter of Joseph-Octave Beaubien, a member of the 1st Canadian Parliament.

Frémont died at Quebec City at the age of 46 after a long illness.

Publications
 Le divorce et la séparation de corps
 Compendium of the Dominion Laws of Canada

Electoral record

Notes

References
  Publications.

External links
 

1855 births
1902 deaths
Liberal Party of Canada MPs
Members of the House of Commons of Canada from Quebec
Mayors of Quebec City
Lawyers in Quebec
Université Laval alumni